The 1987–88 Montreal Canadiens season was the team's 79th season. The club qualified for the playoffs, defeated the Hartford Whalers in the first round, but were eliminated in the Adams Division finals versus the Boston Bruins four games to one.

Offseason
 Canadiens General Manager Serge Savard was part of the four man committee that would select players and coaches for Team Canada at the 1987 Canada Cup. Canadiens head coach Jean Perron would be selected as one of the assistant coaches for Team Canada.

NHL Draft
for more information visit 1988 NHL Entry Draft

Regular season

Defensively, the Canadiens were the best team in the league, finishing the regular season with just 238 goals against. They also allowed the fewest power-play goals, with just 64

Final standings

Schedule and results

 April 3: Stephane Richer becomes the sixth player in Montreal history to score 50 goals in a season with two in the season finale against Buffalo.

Playoffs

Adams Division semi-finals

Hartford Whalers vs. Montreal Canadiens

The Habs almost squandered a 3–0 series lead. The deep Habs roster was the best team in the Wales Conference during the season, consisting of one 50-goal scorer, five 20–goal scorers and another six with between 10 and 20 goals. Their best assets were goaltenders Patrick Roy and backup Brian Hayward who won 23 and 22 games respectively. The Ron Francis-led Whalers went 2–4–2 against the Canadiens during the season, twice losing by just one goal.

Montreal wins best-of-seven series 4–2

Adams Division finals
Boston Bruins vs. Montreal Canadiens

The Wales Conference's two best teams, and the NHL's two best defensive teams, met in this series with equal rest time. The Habs had beaten Boston in the Adams Division Semi-Finals four years in a row, sweeping the Bruins in three of the past four seasons, and beating them 3–2 in a best-of-five the other year. This time, the Bruins' defence would wear down Montreal, as Ken Linseman, Ray Bourque and Cam Neely provided the offence to finally conquer the Canadiens, this despite the fact that the Habs beat them in Game 1 by a score of 5-1. It was the first Bruins' playoff series win over the Habs since the 1942–43 season.

Boston wins best-of-seven series 4–1

Player statistics

Regular season
Scoring

Goaltending

Playoffs
Scoring

Goaltending

Awards and records
 Frank J. Selke Trophy: Guy Carbonneau
 Lady Byng Memorial Trophy: Mats Naslund
 William M. Jennings Trophy: Patrick Roy/Brian Hayward
 Patrick Roy, goaltender, NHL Second Team All-Star

Transactions

Draft picks
Montreal's draft picks at the 1987 NHL Entry Draft held at the Joe Louis Arena in Detroit, Michigan.

Farm teams

See also
 1987–88 NHL season

References
 Canadiens on Hockey Database
 Canadiens on NHL Reference

Montreal Canadiens seasons
Montreal Canadiens season, 1987-88
Montreal
Adams Division champion seasons